Normative in academic disciplines means relating to an ideal standard or model, and in particular a normative statement (or norm see below) is a statement that affirms how things should or ought to be, that is how to value them.

Normative disciplines include:
 Normative economics, a branch of economics that incorporates value judgments
 Normative jurisprudence, a branch of legal theory,
and in philosophy, see
 Normative ethics, a branch of philosophical ethics concerned with morality, and
 Norm (philosophy) 

Normative may also refer to:

 Normative assessment, in education, a type of test or evaluation
 Normative mineralogy, a geochemical mineralogy calculation
Normative grammar, grammar aimed at laying down grammatical norms

See also 

 Normative Aging Study
 Standardization, the process of developing and implementing technical standards sometimes called norms